"If I Was Your Man" is a song by American recording artist Joe. It was written by Mikkel Storleer Eriksen and Tor Erik Hermansen along with Phillip Lamont Jackson for his sixth studio album Ain't Nothin' Like Me (2007), with production handled by the former two for Stargate. The contemporary R&B ballad was selected as the album's second single and released to US radios on July 13, 2007. It peaked at number 84 on the Billboard Hot 100 and reached the top forty of the Hot R&B/Hip-Hop Songs chart. The song's accompanying music video features a cameo appearance by actor Blair Underwood and was inspired by the ending scene of the film Casablanca as his love interest leaves Joe for the man in the plane.

Charts

Weekly charts

Year-end charts

References

2007 singles
2007 songs
Joe (singer) songs
Contemporary R&B ballads
Song recordings produced by Stargate (record producers)
Songs written by Mikkel Storleer Eriksen
Songs written by Tor Erik Hermansen
2000s ballads